Bojan "Kapka" Miladinović (born 24 April 1982) is a retired Serbian professional footballer and current vice-president of Napredak Kruševac.

Club career
After starting out at Napredak, Miladinović was transferred to Red Star Belgrade in the 2004 winter transfer window. He managed to collect three doubles with the club, although receiving very limited playing time. In the summer of 2008, Miladinović briefly returned to his parent club Napredak, before moving abroad and joining Uzbek club Pakhtakor Tashkent. He spent the following six seasons at the club, winning two Uzbek League and two Uzbek Cup titles. Miladinović subsequently moved to Thailand and spent one year with Felda United, before again returning to Napredak in January 2016.

After retiring in January 2019, Miladinović was immediately appointed vice-president of Napredak.

International career
Miladinović represented Serbia and Montenegro at the 2004 UEFA Under-21 Championship, as the team finished runners-up.

Honours

Club
Napredak
 Second League of Serbia and Montenegro: 2002–03
Serbian First League: 2015–16
Red Star Belgrade
 Serbian SuperLiga: 2003–04, 2005–06, 2006–07
 Serbian Cup: 2003–04, 2005–06, 2006–07
Pakhtakor Tashkent
 Uzbek League: 2012, 2014
 Uzbek Cup: 2009, 2011

International
Serbia and Montenegro
 UEFA Under-21 Championship: Runner-up 2004

References

External links
 
 FootballMalaysia profile

Serbia and Montenegro footballers
Serbian footballers
Association football defenders
Expatriate footballers in Malaysia
Expatriate footballers in Uzbekistan
Pakhtakor Tashkent FK players
Felda United F.C. players
FK Napredak Kruševac players
Malaysia Super League players
Sportspeople from Kruševac
Red Star Belgrade footballers
Serbia and Montenegro under-21 international footballers
Serbian expatriate footballers
Serbian expatriate sportspeople in Malaysia
Serbian expatriate sportspeople in Uzbekistan
Serbian First League players
Serbian SuperLiga players
1982 births
Living people